José Carrillo de Albornoz y Montiel, 1st Duke of Montemar, 3rd Count of Montemar (8 October 1671 – 26 June 1747) was a Spanish nobleman and military leader, who conquered the Two Sicilies, Oran and Mazalquivir. He was a member of the Carrillo family, a Spanish noble house, and was Viceroy of Sicily from 1734 to 1737.

Biography
Carrillo was born in Seville. He married Isabel Francisca de Antich y Antich in 1700 with whom he had three children (Francisco, Leonor & María Magdalena). During the War of the Spanish Succession he aligned with the side of Philip of Anjou and fought as mariscal de campo in the Battle of Villaviciosa (1710) in the cavalry under the Count of Aguilar.

He also participated in the Spanish campaign in Sardinia and Sicily during the War of the Quadruple Alliance between 1718 and 1720.

In 1731 he headed the expeditionary force that occupied the Duchy of Parma for its legal heir, Don Carlos, future King Charles III of Spain.

In 1732 Blas de Lezo led the Spanish navy and Carrillo De Albornoz led the Spanish army in retaking Oran and Mazalquivir from the Turks (which had taken both cities in 1708.

In 1733 he commanded the Spanish army that fought and defeated the Austrians in Italy during the War of Polish Succession. His greatest victory was the Battle of Bitonto on 25 May 1734. For this victory, the king Philip V of Spain ennobled him as the first Duke of Montemar.

As a cavalry officer he supported the cavalry charge with the saber in hand against any enemy infantry firing their guns.

He was the first viceroy of Sicily after the Spanish reconquest of the island from 1734 to 1737 and Minister of War from 1737 to 1741.

In 1741 he was appointed as head of the 50,000 men strong expeditionary Spanish army in Italy during the War of Austrian Succession. He would later be replaced at the end of 1742 by Jean Thierry du Mont, comte de Gages.

References

External links  

1671 births
1747 deaths
People from Seville
Viceroys of Sicily
101
Knights of the Golden Fleece of Spain
Knights of Santiago
Spanish generals
Spanish military personnel of the War of the Austrian Succession
Spanish military personnel of the War of the Polish Succession